Feltri is a surname. Notable people with the surname include:

Vittorio Feltri (born 1943), Italian journalist
Thiago Feltri (born 1985), Brazilian footballer